Frankenstein's Monster's Monster, Frankenstein is a surreal comedy mockumentary short film directed by Daniel Gray Longino, written by John Levenstein, and starring David Harbour, Alex Ozerov, Kate Berlant, Mary Woronov, Alfred Molina, Marion Van Cuyck and Heather Lawless. It was released on Netflix on July 16, 2019.

Cast
 David Harbour as David Harbour III, an actor investigating the life of his father, David Harbour Jr.
 Harbour also plays David Harbour Jr., an eccentric actor who portrayed Dr. Frankenstein in the play Frankenstein's Monster's Monster, Frankenstein
 Alex Ozerov as Joey Vallejo, a deceased movie star who portrayed Sal in the play
 Kate Berlant as Monica Fulton, an actress who portrayed Miss Macbeth in the play
 Mary Woronov as Nancy Erlich, the producer of the play
 Alfred Molina as Aubrey Fields, a legendary actor and television host who portrayed the sea captain in the play
 Heather Lawless as the doctor in the play
 Michael Lerner as Bobby Fox, Harbour Jr.'s former agent
 Marion Van Cuyck, the Frankenstein's niece in the play
 Bridey Elliott as a reporter who interviews Harbour Jr.
 O-Lan Jones as Frankenstein's mother in the play
 Lidia Porto as a detective hired by Harbour III to investigate his father
 Graham Wagner as Graham, a dramaturge hired by Harbour III as a personal assistant
 Randolph Thompson as a forensic accountant hired by Harbour III to investigate his father

Reception
The website's critical consensus reads, "While Frankenstein's Monster's Monster, Frankenstein offbeat sense of humor might be too strange for some, those looking for a kooky new comedy will find much to like in its spooky spoofs." Metacritic, which uses a weighted average, assigned a score of 66 out of 100 based on four critics, indicating "generally favorable reviews".

References

External links
 
 
 

English-language television shows
Netflix specials
2010s English-language films